The Shenandoah 100 is an ultra-endurance 100 mile (162 km) mountain bike race held in central Western Virginia near Stokesville.  The race is normally held on the Sunday during Labor Day weekend. The race has been run continuously since 1998. 

The organizer, Shenandoah Mountain Touring based in Harrisonburg, VA also runs the Wilderness 101 in Central Pennsylvania along with numerous other cycling races, events and tours. The SM100 is part of a Nationwide series of endurance races the National Ultra Endurance Series since 2006.

The SM100 course starts and finishes in Stokesville Campground near the Stokesville Observatory. The majority of the course is in George Washington National Forest and uses part of the Wild Oak Trail. The course is primarily in Virginia but a small section crosses into West Virginia. The course covers the USGS Topo Maps of Stokesville, Palo Alto, Reddish Knob and West Augusta. As the name implies, the course is 100 miles long and has nearly 12,500 feet of vertical climbing.

Notable Records
Larry Camp, of Chambersburg, Pennsylvania, is the only rider to have completed the first 20 editions of the event, finishing again in 2018 in 13:43 (unofficial). Jeremiah Bishop holds the record for fastest male finisher at 6:49 in 2015 and Andrea Dvorak holds the record for fastest female finisher at 8:09 in 2017. The longest finisher recorded was Neil Curtis in 1999 taking 18:07 to finish.

Results

See also
 Wilderness 101 Mountain Bicycle Race

External links
 US National Ultra Endurance Mountain Bike Series
 The Shenandoah 100 Home Page

Cycle races in the United States
Mountain biking events in the United States
Endurance games
Recurring sporting events established in 1998
1998 establishments in Virginia